Petalomyrmex (from Greek petalos, "flattened" + myrmex, "ant") is a genus of ants in the subfamily Formicinae. It contains the single species Petalomyrmex phylax, known only from Cameroon. The genus is closely related to Aphomomyrmex.

References

External links

Endemic fauna of Cameroon
Formicinae
Monotypic ant genera
Hymenoptera of Africa